Konzum plus d.o.o. is the leading supermarket chain in Croatia, with a tradition of 65 years.

The company employs more than 10,000 people, and in Croatia has more than 600 stores in over 300 cities in the continental and coastal region. More than 500,000 consumers shop in Konzum every day (2022).

Konzum is the first retailer in Croatia to introduce online store and door-to-door delivery and the online store has more than 155,000 registered users (2022) and covers the wider area of the City of Zagreb, Split, Zadar, Rijeka, Osijek, Đakovo, Vukovar and Vinkovci. Konzum's total sales revenue in 2021 amounted to HRK 10.423 billion.

As of April 1, 2019, the company Konzum d.d. operates as Konzum plus d.o.o. Fortenova Group is the only founder of the company Konzum plus d.o.o.

History 

 1957 Konzum opens the first supermarket in Zagreb at Ilica 22, as well as the first supermarket in the country at the time.
 1970 Konzum grows into a retail chain under a new name – Unikonzum.
 1995 Unikonzum becomes Konzum again. Super Konzum Vukovarska, the first supermarket in Croatia to operate according to Western European standards is opened.
 2000 Konzum's retail network expands and the first stores are opened outside Zagreb. LDC Zagreb, the largest logistics and distribution center in this part of Europe, is opened.
 2001 The first wholesale centers opened in Zagreb, Rijeka and Varaždin.
 2002 Konzum Plus Card, the first customer loyalty reward program in Croatia is launched. Konzum Internet store is launched.
 2003 Velpro, a new brand in the wholesale business segment, is introduced.
 2004 Konzum changes its logo, and a new visual identity is still used today. Thanks to the further expansion of the network of stores, Konzum is present in all Croatian counties and offers customers standardization of products and services throughout the country.
 2009 The first retail chain that introduces a 2D barcode bill payment service in stores. A new logistics and distribution center is opened in Zagreb with an additional 36,000 m2 of storage space. Konzum introduces a self-monitoring system in all retail and storage facilities in accordance with the principles of the HACCP food safety system.
 2010 Konzum and its partners launch MultiPlusCard, the coalition's first loyalty reward program. Konzum Academy, center for selection and education of employees is opened. Internal organoleptic laboratory for brand quality control is opened. Konzum introduces environmental management system according to the requirements of the international standard ISO 14001.
 2011 The largest and most modern new logistics and distribution center in the region LDC Dalmatina is opened in Dugopolje, with a total area of 85,000 m2. Konzum starts implementation of Oracle Retail software, the world's best technology solution for retail and wholesale. The first self-service cash registers are set up in larger format stores.
 2014 Konzum expands its business with Konzum benz petrol stations. Konzum introduces Pick-up service for ordered products, and places Konzum Express smart trolleys in stores. Konzum also introduces coupons on accounts and Konzum gift cards, m-Payment services and contactless payment. Konzum mobile application is launched. Food safety management system is introduced according to the requirements of the international standard ISO 22000.
 2015 Konzum klik, an improved online store is introduced. Super Konzum Radnička is opened, which brings a conceptual departure from the standard store and a completely new shopping experience.
 2017 The process of restructuring Konzum begins. Energy management system is introduced, according to the requirements of the international standard ISO 50001.
 2018 Konzum is awarded for the first time for the highest food donation in Brussels as part of an initiative launched by Biljana Borzan, the European Parliament's rapporteur on reducing waste and increasing food donations and Zoran Grozdanov, the coordinator of the Food Network platform. In July, the creditors vote and the decision of the Commercial Court in Zagreb confirms the settlement in the extraordinary administration proceedings against Agrokor d.d. and its subsidiaries and affiliates, the process of preparing for its implementation begins.
 2019 Konzum d.d. starts operating as Konzum plus d.o.o., a company owned by the Fortenova Group. Konzum launches the first digital loyalty campaign – Zdravoljupci and a self-service bakery in stores.
 2020 Konzum annexes VELPRO-CENTAR plus d.o.o., the largest wholesale in Croatia. Konzum Kaptol, another modern and innovative store with a specific offer, decoration and visual identity is opened. Cashless self-service cash registers are introduced in smaller format stores. In the COVID pandemic period, Konzum introduces additional protection and security measures and ensures a stable supply chain.
 2021 With the takeover of the Miracolo retail chain and the opening of five new stores, Konzum's retail network includes a total of 624 stores. Konzum is the first retail chain to introduce cryptocurrency payments.

Stores
Konzum offers products and services in stores of various formats - smaller stores in the neighborhood for everyday shopping, Konzum Maxi stores for larger weekly purchases and Super Konzum stores which offer everything one household needs in one place.

See also
 Fortenova group

References

Supermarkets of Croatia
Supermarkets of Bosnia and Herzegovina
Retail companies established in 1957
Croatian brands
Companies based in Zagreb
Agrokor
1957 establishments in Croatia